Carolyn Baxter (born 1953) is an African-American poet, playwright, and musician. Baxter is from Harlem, New York. She was a participant in the Black Panthers School Breakfast Program. Baxter was formerly incarcerated at the New York City Correctional Institute for Women at Rikers Island. Her writings are considered a part of the Prison Art's Movement of the 1960s and 1970s.

Biography 
Baxter worked for the National Association for the Advancement of Colored People NAACP and was a member of the Black Panthers Party. She also worked for the New York City Board of Education in programs for ex-offenders and adolescent offenders. Baxter is a member of the United Federation for Teachers.she is a proud member Lof ASCAP and SAG/A.F.T.R.A The Screen and Television Performers. She plays conga/bass.

Baxter was formerly incarcerated at the New York City Correctional Institute for Women at Rikers Island. There, she joined the Free Space Writing Project. Her writings are considered a part of the Prison Art's Movement of the 1970s and 1980s.  Baxter served time with the singer/poet Marilyn Buck. One of her most famous poems is about masturbating silently on her cot so as not to alert the guards of what she was doing. Baxter attended BARD College after her incarceration.

Brown University did an exhibit titled, Poetry in the Time of Mass Incarceration, which displayed Baxter's writings in the John Hay Library's Willis Reading Room at Brown from September 2015 – January 4, 2016. Her work has been used in studies of the prison industrial complex.

Publications

Books 
 Prison Solitary and Other Free Government Services (Greenfield Review Press, 1979)

Anthologies 
 20th Century Prison Writings (Penguin/Putnam, 1998)
 The Light from Another Country (Greenfield Review Press, 1984), 
 Wall Tappings Vol 1 (Feminist Press, 1986)
 Wall Tappings Vol 2 (Feminist Press, 2005)

References 

1953 births
Living people
African-American poets
American dramatists and playwrights
American women writers
People from Harlem
Writers from Manhattan
21st-century African-American people
21st-century African-American women
20th-century African-American people
20th-century African-American women
African-American women writers